Sclerophrys brauni is a species of toad in the family Bufonidae.

It is endemic to Tanzania.
Its natural habitats are subtropical or tropical moist lowland forests, subtropical or tropical moist montane forests, subtropical or tropical dry shrubland, rivers, and heavily degraded former forest.
It is threatened by habitat loss.

References

brauni
Frogs of Africa
Amphibians of Tanzania
Endemic fauna of Tanzania
Amphibians described in 1911
Taxa named by Fritz Nieden
Taxonomy articles created by Polbot